St. Thomas' Episcopal Church Complex is a historic Episcopal church complex at 158-168 W. Boston Post Road in Mamaroneck, Westchester County, New York.  The complex, built between 1884 and 1925, comprises a cluster of four buildings.  The Gothic Revival-style church is constructed entirely of rough-dressed Belleville brownstone with a red slate gable roof.  It features a square tower on the north facade with clock faces and louvres.  The property also includes the Parish House / Chapel (1884-1886), Endowment Building (1887), and Heathcote Hall (1925).

It was added to the National Register of Historic Places in 2003.

See also
National Register of Historic Places listings in southern Westchester County, New York
St. Thomas' Church, Mamaroneck, NY

References

Mamaroneck, New York
Episcopal church buildings in New York (state)
Churches on the National Register of Historic Places in New York (state)
National Register of Historic Places in Westchester County, New York
Gothic Revival church buildings in New York (state)
Churches in Westchester County, New York